The Spy in Black (US: U-Boat 29) is a 1939 British film, and the first collaboration between the British filmmakers Michael Powell and Emeric Pressburger.  They were brought together by Alexander Korda to make the World War I spy thriller novel of the same title by Joseph Storer Clouston into a film. Powell and Pressburger eventually made  over 20 films during the course of their partnership.

The Spy in Black stars Conrad Veidt, Valerie Hobson and Sebastian Shaw, with Marius Goring and Torin Thatcher as two German submarine officers. Grant Sutherland, a minister in Powell's The Edge of the World (1937), appears in this film as a Scottish air raid warden.

Plot
In March 1917, Captain Hardt (Conrad Veidt), a World War I German U-boat commander, is ordered to lead a mission to attack the British Fleet at Scapa Flow, rendezvousing at the Old Man of Hoy. He sneaks ashore on the Orkney Islands to meet his contact, Fräulein Tiel (Valerie Hobson). Tiel has taken over the identity of a new local schoolteacher, Miss Anne Burnett (June Duprez), who female German agents had intercepted and chloroformed en route to the island. Hardt finds himself attracted to her, but Tiel shows no interest. The Germans are aided by a disgraced Royal Navy officer, the former Commander Ashington (Sebastian Shaw) who, according to Tiel, has agreed to aid the Germans after losing his command due to drunkenness, and Tiel implies that she has slept with Ashington to obtain his cooperation.

The plan is almost disrupted when Burnett's fiancé, Rev. Harris, arrives unexpectedly, but the spies take him captive. Then the local minister, Matthews, and his wife (who had already met Harris) come to the house, but Tiel manages to get them to leave. Now equipped with the crucial information he needs about the British fleet movements, Hardt rendezvous with his submarine to arrange for a fleet of U-Boats to attack. Returning to the house, and confident that all is going to plan, Hardt makes advances to Tiel, but she rebuffs him. She leaves the house, believing she has locked Hardt in his room, but he gets out and secretly follows her, discovering that she has gone out to meet Ashington. Hardt overhears them talking and learns the truth: the British are fully aware of his presence, and have turned his mission into a trap for the U-Boats. Hardt's "contacts" are really British double agents – Ashington is in fact RN Commander Blacklock, and "Fräulein Tiel" is Blacklock's wife, Jill.

As Jill prepares to leave the island, Blacklock returns to the house to arrest Hardt, only to find he has eluded them. Disguised in Rev. Harris's clothes, Hardt manages to board the island ferry, which is also carrying Jill, a number of civilian passengers, and eight German POWs. Blacklock reports Hardt's escape to the base commander, who explains that the British had learned of the Germans' plan because the real Anne Burnett luckily survived the German agents' attempt to kill her by throwing her into the sea.

At sea, Hardt manages to free the German prisoners and they seize the ferry. The Royal Navy pursue them, but before they can catch up, the ferry is intercepted by Hardt's submarine, and Hardt's first officer, Lieutenant Schuster (Marius Goring) decides to sink it. As the U-boat surfaces and prepares to fire, Hardt realises it is his own submarine. He frantically attempts to signal them, but too late – the U-boat shells the ferry, which begins to sink. By this time the British ships have arrived, and they drop depth charges, destroying the fleeing U-boat. As Jill, the other passengers and the crew abandon the sinking ferry, Hardt realises all is lost, and chooses to go down with the ship.

Cast
 Conrad Veidt as Capt. Hardt
 Sebastian Shaw as Lt. Ashington/Cmdr. David Blacklock
 Valerie Hobson as Fräulein Tiel (schoolmistress)/Jill Blacklock
 Esma Cannon as Maggie. 
 Marius Goring as Lt. Felix Schuster
 June Duprez as Miss Anne Burnett
 Athole Stewart as Rev. Hector Matthews
 Agnes Lauchlan as Mrs. Matthews
 Helen Haye as Mrs. Sedley
 Cyril Raymond as Rev. John Harris
 George Summers as Capt. Walter Ratter (ferry captain)
 Hay Petrie as James, the Ferry Engineer
 Grant Sutherland as Bob Bratt
 Robert Rendel as Admiral
 Mary Morris as Edwards, the Chauffeuse
 Margaret Moffatt as Kate
 Kenneth Warrington as Cmdr. Denis
 Torin Thatcher as Submarine officer

Cast notes
 Bernard Miles has a small uncredited part as Hans, the hotel receptionist.
 Graham Stark has an uncredited part as a bellboy.
 Skelton Knaggs has a small uncredited part as the German sailor looking for Capt. Hardt.

Production
The Spy in Black was filmed at Denham Studios, with location shooting at Northchurch Common in Berkhamsted, Hertfordshire and in Orkney, Scotland.  The film wrapped production on 24 December 1938 and was released in the U.K. on 7 August 1939 – just weeks before the country again went to war with Germany.  Its American premiere was held in New York City on 5 October of that year, and it went into general release two days later.

Critical reception
The Monthly Film Bulletin wrote "This intricate story is gripping from beginning to end, and very skilfully directed"; Variety opined "Production is A1, as is the direction"; and The New York Times called it "the most exciting spy melodrama since the advent of the Second World War. The British may not have the Bremen, but they still have Conrad Veidt."

Awards and honours
This film  was named by the National Board of Review as one of the ten best films of 1939.

References

External links
 
 
 
 
 The Spy in Black reviews and articles at the Powell & Pressburger Pages
 . Full synopsis and film stills (and clips viewable from UK libraries).

1939 films
1930s spy films
British black-and-white films
British spy films
Films shot at Denham Film Studios
Films directed by Michael Powell
Films by Powell and Pressburger
World War I spy films
World War I submarine films
Films set in Orkney
U-boat fiction
Films scored by Miklós Rózsa
Films based on British novels
Films produced by Alexander Korda
Films set in 1917
British World War I films
1930s British films